Pulp noir is a subgenre influenced by various "noir" genres, as well as (as implied by its name) pulp fiction genres; particularly the hard-boiled genres which help give rise to film noir. Pulp noir is marked by its use of classic noir techniques, but with urban influences. Various media include film, illustrations, photographs and videogames.

In film
Whereas film noir directly involves characters living bleak existences to accomplish a goal with odds against them, pulp noir often portrays a grittier, one-man army. Typically, the main character has no distinguishing abilities, but can hold ground against seemingly impossible odds. Pulp noir locations are often seedy, run-down and degradated urban landscapes, where the lack of law, morals and even the proliferation of crime and drugs are common themes. Another common trend in pulp noir is the glorification and/or demonization of its urban locations.

Examples
Cat People (1942)
Double Indemnity (1944)
Detour (1945)
Gilda (1946)
The Killers (1946)
Out of the Past (1947)
The Naked City (1948)
Thieves Highway (1949)
Pickup on South Street (1953)
Kiss Me Deadly (1955)
Shock Corridor (1963)
The Naked Kiss (1964)
Bonnie and Clyde (1967)
Batman (1989)
Dick Tracy (1990)
The Rocketeer (1991)
Pulp Fiction (1994), which itself is an ode to the classic pulp noir/pulp fiction genre.
Million Dollar Baby (2004)
 The film adaptation of Frank Miller's Sin City (2005)
The Paperboy (2012)
The Wild Goose Lake (2019)

In other media
Some illustrations and photographs are described as being pulp noir. Recently, some video games, such as the Max Payne third-person shooter series, have been portrayed in a film noir style, using heavy, gritty, dirty urban themes. SF Weekly journalist Matt Smith used the term to describe the act of "sprinting to the crime scene, skidding on my heels, and yelling at everyone and nobody in particular: 'Who's in charge here?'"

See also
 Neo-noir
 Pulp magazines
 Vulgar auteurism
 Arthouse action film
 B-movie

Notes

Film noir
 
Film genres
1940s in film
1950s in film
1960s in film
1990s in film
2000s in film
2010s in film